

Max Heinrich Sachsenheimer (5 December 1909 – 2 June 1973) was a German general in the Wehrmacht during World War II who commanded the 17th Infantry Division. He was a recipient of the Knight's Cross of the Iron Cross with Oak Leaves and Swords of Nazi Germany.

Awards
 Iron Cross (1939) 2nd Class (25 May 1940) & 1st Class (15 June 1940)
 German Cross in Gold on 3 February 1943 as Major in the II./Jäger-Regiment 75
 Knight's Cross of the Iron Cross with Oak Leaves and Swords
 Knight's Cross on 5 April 1942 as Hauptmann and commander of II./Jäger-Regiment 75
 472nd Oak Leaves on 14 May 1944 as Major and leader of Jäger-Regiment 75
 132nd Swords on 6 February 1945 as Generalmajor and commander of 17. Infanterie-Division

References

Citations

Bibliography

 
 
 

1909 births
1973 deaths
Major generals of the German Army (Wehrmacht)
Recipients of the Gold German Cross
Recipients of the Knight's Cross of the Iron Cross with Oak Leaves and Swords
German prisoners of war in World War II held by the United States
Military personnel from Baden-Württemberg